The Sandwich Girl is a 1933 German comedy film directed by Carl Boese and starring Lucie Englisch, Jakob Tiedtke, and Else Reval.

The film's sets were designed by the art directors Artur Gunther and Willi Herrmann.

Cast

References

Bibliography

External links 
 

1933 films
1933 comedy films
Films of the Weimar Republic
German comedy films
1930s German-language films
Films directed by Carl Boese
German black-and-white films
1930s German films